Kunzea bracteolata  is a plant in the myrtle family found north of Glen Innes in northern New South Wales and in southern Queensland. It is a small shrub with spreading branches, small elliptic leaves and strongly scented white flowers on the ends of the branches in late spring.

Description
The leaves are covered with fine hairs when young and only the mid-vein is obvious. The flowers are white, have a strong honey-scent and are arranged in clusters on the ends of the branches.

Taxonomy and naming
Kunzea bracteolata was first formally described in 1905 by Joseph Maiden and Ernst Betche and the description was published in Proceedings of the Linnean Society of New South Wales. The type specimen was collected in 1904 by John Boorman, who collected widely for the Sydney Botanic Gardens. The specific epithet (bracteolata) is a Latin word meaning "overlaid with scales".

Distribution and habitat
This kunzea grows in forest on granite in scattered populations north from Glen Innes to southern Queensland. There is a large population in the Gibraltar Range National Park.

Use in horticulture
Kunzea bracteolata has profuse, conspicuous, scented white flowers which are visited by many insects. The plant can be propagated from cuttings, is frost tolerant and drought tolerant when established but benefits from being pruned to maintain its shape.

References

bracteolata
Flora of New South Wales
Flora of Queensland
Plants described in 1905